The following is a list of political families in Fiji.

List
NOTE: Most of Fiji's political families listed below are, in fact, related by ancestry or by marriage.  The Nailatikau family is a subset of the Cakobau family; both are connected by marriage - as well as by ancestral ties - with the Mara and Ganilau families.  Tracing family relationships in Fiji is complicated by the fact that many prominent Fijians do not use family names).The Bavadra Family  (husband-wife)
Timoci Bavadra - Prime Minister of Fiji (1987)
Adi Kuini Speed (widow of Timoci Bavadra; Cabinet Minister (1999-2000)

Descendants of Seru Epenisa Cakobau  Cakobau was the Fijian monarch who unified the nation in 1871, and ceded it to Britain in 1874.  Many twentieth-century politicians are direct descendants of his.''

Great-grandchildren:
Ratu Sir Edward Cakobau - Military commander, Deputy Prime Minister (1970s).
Ratu Sir George Cakobau - Governor-General of Fiji (1973-1983)
Ratu Sir Kamisese Mara (founding father; Prime Minister 1967-1992; President 1993-2000).
Ro Lady Lala Mara (2nd cousin and wife of Ratu Sir Kamisese; co-founder of the Soqosoqo ni Vakavulewa ni Taukei); maternal great-granddaughter.
Ratu Sir Lala Sukuna (1888-1958 - Fiji's first modern statesman.  Soldier, scholar, statesman; Paramount Chief; first indigenous Fijian Speaker of Fiji's Legislative Council (1950s).  Maternal great-grandson.
Ro Teimumu Vuikaba Kepa (née Tuisaiwau) (maternal great-granddaughter; sister of Ro Lady Lala Mara) - Minister of Education (2001-2006); Member of Parliament and leader of the Social Democratic Liberal Party (2014–present).
Great-great-grandchildren
Ratu Epeli Nailatikau (soldier, diplomat, President of Fiji (2009 — present); previously Deputy Prime Minister (2000-2001), Speaker of the House of Representatives (2001-2006); Minister of Foreign Affairs (2007 - 2008); son of Ratu Sir Edward Cakobau
Ratu Tu'uakitau Cokanauto - son of Ratu Sir Edward Cakobau (q.v.), brother of Ratu Epeli Nailatikau (q.v.); Cabinet Minister (2000 - 2001).
Ratu Alifereti Finau Mara (son of Ratu Sir Kamisese Mara (q.v.); soldier, leader of the Fijian Association Party and cabinet minister (1990s); Fijian Ambassador to the United Nations).
Adi Koila Mara Nailatikau (daughter of Ratu Sir Kamisese Mara (q.v.) and wife of Ratu Epeli Nailatikau; diplomat, cabinet minister (1999-2000), and Senator (2001-2006)
Ratu George Cakobau - Senator (2001-2006); son of Ratu Sir George Cakobau (q.v.)
Adi Litia Cakobau - Senator (2001-2006) and former Cabinet Minister; daughter of Ratu Sir George Cakobau (q.v.)
Adi Samanunu Cakobau-Talakuli - Senator and Cabinet Minister (2006–present) and former High Commissioner to Malaysia; daughter of Ratu Sir George Cakobau (q.v.)
Great-great-great grandchildren
Adi Kuini Speed; widow of Timoci Bavadra (q.v.); Cabinet Minister (1999-2000) (also listed under Bavadra family)
Sixth-generation descendants
Roko Tupou Draunidalo; daughter of Adi Kuini Speed (q.v.); Member of Parliament and President of the National Federation Party.
The Ganilau Family 
Ratu Sir Penaia Ganilau - first President of Fiji (1987-1992); maternal great-grandson of Seru Epenisa Cakobau.
Ratu Epeli Ganilau - son of Ratu Sir Penaia; husband of Adi Ateca Mara (daughter of Ratu Sir Kamisese Mara); soldier, co-founder of the Christian Democratic Alliance (1998), Chairman, Great Council of Chiefs (2001-2004), founder of the National Alliance Party (2005).
Bernadette Rounds Ganilau - wife of Ratu Rabici Ganilau (son of Ratu Sir Penaia Ganilau); United Peoples Party parliamentarian (2006).

The Khaiyum Family (son - father - father-in-law)
Aiyaz Sayed-Khaiyum - Attorney General
Sayed Abdul Khaiyum - Member of Parliament
Viliame Gavoka - Member of Parliament

The Patel Family 1 (brothers)
A. D. Patel - founder of the National Federation Party
R. D. Patel - Speaker of the House of Representatives

The Patel Family 2 (brothers)
 Navin Patel - Member of House of Representatives 1977 - 1987
 Vinod Patel - Member of House of Representatives 1994 - 1999

The Speight Family  (father-sons)
Sam Speight - Cabinet Minister (1990s)
George Speight - coup leader
Samisoni Tikoinasau - Member of Parliament

The Singh Family 1 (brothers-son)
 Parmanand Singh - Younger brother - one of the first Indo-Fijian members of the Legislative Council 
 Chattur Singh - Elder brother - member of Legislative Council
 Anand Singh - Parmanand's son - member of House of Representatives and Senate

The Singh Family 2 (half-brothers - nephew)
 James Shankar Singh - elder half-brother of Uday - Alliance Minister, later joined the National Federation Party
 Uday Singh - younger half-brother of James - Alliance Party, one term  member of Parliament
 Vijay R. Singh- Nephew of the brothers - Alliance Minister, later joined the National Federation Party

The Lakshman Family (father - son - grandson)
 B. D. Lakshman -Member of Legislative Council 1940-1944 and 1959-1963
 Prince Gopal Lakshman - son of B.D. Lakshman - Member of House of Representatives 1999-2006
 Chaitanya Lakshman - grandson of B D Lakshman - Member of House of Representatives in 2006 and member of multi-party cabinet

The Maharaj Family (father - son)
 James Ramchandar Maharaj - Member of Legislative Council of Fiji in 1929.
Navin Maharaj son of James Ramchandar Maharaj - Member of House of Representatives 1987

The Madhavan Family (father - son)
 James Madhavan - member of the Legislative Council of Fiji from 1947 to 1972
 Shiromaniam Madhavan - son of James was member of the House of Representatives of Fiji from 1992 to 1994.

Fiji
Politics of Fiji
Families
Fiji